Rauchtown Run, named Rauchtown Creek on United States Geological Survey maps, is a tributary of the West Branch Susquehanna River in Clinton and Lycoming Counties, Pennsylvania, in the United States.

History and geography
Rauchtown Run flows through the eastern portions of Clinton County and into the southwestern corner of Lycoming County where it sinks underground in Limestone Township and emerges as Antes Creek at Nippenose Spring in the same township before joining the West Branch Susquehanna River near Jersey Shore. Antes Creek was historically known as Nippenose Creek. 

Nippenose is likely derived from a Lenape term "Nipeno-wi", meaning "like the summer." The name "Antes Creek" honors Lt Colonel John Henry Ante, after whom nearby Fort Antes was also named. Other variant names include: Sunken Creek, Antis Creek and Rauch Creek.

See also
List of rivers of Pennsylvania

References

Rivers of Pennsylvania
Tributaries of the West Branch Susquehanna River
Rivers of Clinton County, Pennsylvania
Rivers of Lycoming County, Pennsylvania